Oregonia may refer to:
Oregonia, Ohio
Oregonia (genus), a genus of crabs
Oregonian Biogeographic Province